Andrei or Andrey Krylov may refer to:

 Andrey Krylov (swimmer born 1956), Soviet swimmer
 Andrey Krylov (swimmer born 1984), Russian swimmer
 Andrey Krylov (gymnast) (born 1988), Russian trampolinist
 Andrei Krylov (born 1959), Russian guitarist and composer
 Andrei Krylov (mathematician) (born 1956), Russian mathematician